This is a list of local nature reserves (LNR) in North Yorkshire. The list accounts for the post-1974 area of North Yorkshire, and includes the local authority areas of Middlesbrough and Redcar and Cleveland as well as the City of York. As such, it includes areas in places such as Harrogate, that prior to 1974, were in the historic county of the West Riding of Yorkshire.

Local nature reserves (LNRs) are designated by local authorities under the National Parks and Access to the Countryside Act 1949. The local authority must have a legal control over the site, by owning or leasing it or having an agreement with the owner. LNRs are sites which have a special local interest either biologically or geologically, and local authorities have a duty to care for them. They can apply local bye-laws to manage and protect LNRs. As of May 2018, North Yorkshire has 18 designated local nature reserves.

Sites

Notes

References

External links
LNR List for North Yorkshire

Nature reserves in North Yorkshire
National nature reserves in England
 
North Yorkshire-related lists
North Yorkshire